Christmas with the Kranks is a 2004 American Christmas comedy film based on the 2001 novel Skipping Christmas by John Grisham. It was directed by Joe Roth, written and produced by Chris Columbus, and starring Tim Allen, Jamie Lee Curtis, Dan Aykroyd, Erik Per Sullivan, Cheech Marin, Jake Busey, and M. Emmet Walsh. The film tells of a couple who decide to skip Christmas one year since their daughter is away, much to the chagrin of their neighbors until their daughter decides to come home at the last minute. This was Tom Poston's final film before his death in 2007.

Plot
After Riverside, Illinois couple Luther and Nora Krank see their daughter, Blair, depart for a Peace Corps assignment in Peru on the Sunday following Thanksgiving, empty nest syndrome sets in. Luther calculates that they spent $6,132 during the previous year's holiday season, and, not looking forward to celebrating Christmas without their daughter, he suggests they invest the money usually spent on decorations, gifts, and entertainment and treat themselves to a ten-day Caribbean cruise instead. Luther insists that they completely boycott the holidays, and eventually Nora agrees.

The Kranks discover they are considered pariahs due to their decision to skip the holidays. Most vocal in their objections are neighbors Vic Frohmeyer and Walt Scheel. Vic, who is the self-proclaimed leader of the street, organizes a campaign to force the Kranks to decorate their home. Walt does not seem to like Luther, so his efforts are primarily personal. However, it is revealed that Walt's wife Bev is suffering from cancer, perhaps dampening his holiday spirits. 

Children, led by Vic's son Spike, constantly push them to put up a Frosty the Snowman decoration, and Christmas carolers try to revive the Kranks' holiday spirit by singing on their lawn, which Luther stops by icing it. The newspaper prints a front-page story complete with a photograph of the unlit Krank house, and Luther's office colleagues, scout tree salesmen, and police fund collectors are also annoyed. However, Luther and Nora continue to stand their ground.

The couple are packing for the cruise on Christmas Eve morning when they receive a call from Blair, who announces that she is at Miami International Airport, en route home with her Peruvian fiancé Enrique as a surprise for her parents. When Blair asks if they are having their usual party that night, a panicked Nora says yes. Luther and Nora try to decorate the house and coordinate a party with only twelve hours before their daughter and future son-in-law arrive.

While Nora scrambles to find food, Luther goes to buy a tree, but is unable to get anything but a small, dried-up tree. Luther attempts to borrow the indoor tree of neighbor Wes Trogdon, who is going away for a week, with the warning that he is not to damage it. Luther enlists Spike's help to transport the tree across the street, but the neighbors spot him and, assuming he is stealing it, call the police. Spike shows that Luther has Trogdon's keys, and thus was given permission to borrow the tree. Nora comes home, having only been able to obtain smoked trout, and tells Luther to put up Frosty on their roof, which fails when he and Frosty fall off.

Once it is established why Luther is trying frantically to decorate his home, the neighbors, led by Vic, come out in full force to help them ready it for Blair. She calls to say they landed from Miami, and the neighbors send the police to pick her up and stall long enough to let everyone finish setting up, during which they apprehend a burglar.

The party starts off strong, with Blair having no idea of the earlier drama. Enrique thanks everyone for the warm welcome, and Nora thanks her neighbors for being a strong community. Luther, to everyone's disappointment, offers only a half-hearted toast. When Nora confronts her husband, he tries to convince her to still go on the cruise, but Nora refuses, disgusted that he is not happy that Blair is home. 

Having a change of heart, Luther slips out of the house, going across the street to the Scheel's. Bev's cancer, once in remission, has returned and, knowing this may be their last holiday together, Luther insists they take the cruise instead, even offering to catsit Muffles, to allow them to go. At first Walt and Bev decline, but ultimately decide to accept his generosity.

Meanwhile, the burglar tricks Spike into releasing him so he can rob the Krank's house, but he gets stopped by Marty and arrested again. Luther, whose holiday spirit has been renewed, finally admits that skipping Christmas was not a good idea, with Nora suggesting they should do it next year.

Cast

Production

Development
Joe Roth knew about John Grisham's Skipping Christmas before it was published in 2001. He was asked by Grisham to read the book in galley form, assuming he could direct a movie based on it. Roth recalls: "It turns out he was right. Even while I was reading it, all I could think was that this would make a great Christmas movie. It had humor, it had wonderful characters and it had heart." With the rights of the book received and the May 2000 founding of Revolution Studios, he stated that "as a start-up company, there was a great deal of work to do in order to get up and running."

Later, filmmaker Chris Columbus, who also bought the rights to Skipping Christmas and had written a screenplay, called Roth about directing the adaptation. As Roth explains: "Naturally, I thought he was going to direct it. But he said, 'No, you should direct it.' It turns out I was getting ready to direct another project. But when I read Chris's script, I knew I had to at least try to direct it. I promised myself that if I could get the right cast in place, I would do it." Producer Michael Barnathan said, "Joe read the script on a Sunday, bought it on Monday, decided he wanted to direct it on Tuesday and by Friday had cast Tim [Allen] and Jamie Lee [Curtis]. The following Monday morning we started pre-production."

Setting
Christmas with the Kranks takes place mostly in the Kranks' neighborhood of Hemlock Street in Riverside, a suburb of Chicago, Illinois, over the course of four weeks from Thanksgiving to Christmas Eve. Production designer Garreth Stover originally looked for locations with the right weather conditions and suburban ambience for Hemlock Street, as described specifically in Columbus's script of the film. He was scouting from the metropolitan area of Chicago to Minnesota, but due to the extreme conditions of this part of the United States at the time, the filmmakers felt it was better to set up the neighborhood in an empty location instead of finding one.

When looking for a place to build the set 15 weeks before filming began, Stover chose a parking lot of a former Boeing aircraft factory in Downey, California, about 15 miles away from downtown Los Angeles and in the midst of Downey Studios. The rest of the first three weeks were spent on designing the houses with assistance from construction coordinator David Elliott. In the next 12 weeks, hundreds of carpenters, plasterers and painters had built what would become the largest exterior set ever for a movie, being more than 700 feet long and including 16 houses. What Stover called "the core five" were the houses of the Kranks, the Frohmeyers, the Scheels, the Beckers and the Trogdons, which he claimed had "full ground floors that are dressed and you can see into." He also said that the second floor of the Kranks' was built on a soundstage. Producer Michael Barnathan claimed that the set would later be available for other movies, TV series and commercials to use. However, due to both health complaints from the locals over toxic residues and a lack of profit, the studio closed in 2012 and was razed to build a mall.

The scenes involving Nora Krank's excursion to the supermarket to procure a "Mel's Hickory Honey Ham" were filmed at Cordons Ranch Market, located at 2931 Honolulu Ave, Glendale, California.

Costumes
Susie DeSanto handled the costume design of Christmas with the Kranks. According to DeSanto, "I was looking for a project that was really textural, and maybe a bit nostalgic. I saw Christmas with the Kranks like a Christmas card, a beautiful Christmas memory of how we wish the holiday to be. So a lot of the fabrics I chose were not so much high-tech bright colors, but wools, plaids and mixing patterns. Joe [Roth] was specific about what he wanted, but within that, he allowed me a great deal of freedom to express myself. However he did not have any impute on the tan segment of the movie where Luthor and Nora Krank were wearing colourful underwear to look their best for the cruise"

DeSanto viewed that all the characters in Christmas with the Kranks would wear dresses that are supposed to serve as their "accents" rather than overtly defining them. Luther Krank is seen wearing the same-colored shirt and suit at work all the time, and according to DeSanto, this "tells that Luther's a punch-the-clock kind of guy, so the whole idea of skipping Christmas and going off on a tropical vacation is completely averse to anything he's ever done." She described Nora as "tasteful and kind of folksy, a middle-American woman approaching middle age. In our first meeting, Jamie Lee Curtis was totally prepared. She wanted to look like a real Midwestern woman who lives in the suburbs of Chicago and is as obsessed with Christmas as everyone around her. Nora dresses for the seasons and I found out by speaking to people at Marshall Field's in Chicago that the Christmas sweater is a big deal. And Jamie wears it so well." As for Vic Frohmeyer, she saw him as "a sort of commander-in-chief of the neighborhood, so I wanted something with a bit of a military flair. Since he's also a college professor, we cut the pattern from a general's jacket and made it professorial by using a vintage tweed mixed with corduroy."

Music
The soundtrack was produced and supervised by American musician Steven Van Zandt, who arranged and produced 6 of the tracks. It features many holiday standards, including "Jingle Bell Rock" by Brenda Lee; "Rudolph the Red-Nosed Reindeer" by Billy May & His Orchestra with vocal by Alvin Stoller; "I Saw Mommy Kissing Santa Claus" by Eddie Dunstedter; "White Christmas" by Dean Martin; "Frosty the Snowman" by Steve Van Zandt; "Blue Christmas" by Elvis Presley; and "The Christmas Song" by Ella Fitzgerald.

It received generally favorable reviews, with many critics appreciating the use of garage rock as a "fresh take" on Christmas music. Houston Press featured it on their list of top 10 Christmas movie soundtracks.

Reception

Box office
On its opening weekend, it earned $21.6 million on 3,393 screens, ranking #3 behind National Treasure and The Incredibles. It eventually grossed $96.6 million worldwide.

Critical response
 It is the second-worst reviewed Christmas movie on the site, behind The Nutcracker in 3D. On Metacritic, the film has a score of 22 out of 100 based on 33 critics, indicating "generally unfavorable reviews". Audiences polled by CinemaScore gave the film an average grade of "B" on an A+ to F scale.

Roger Ebert gave the film 1/4 stars, calling it "a holiday movie of stunning awfulness that gets even worse when it turns gooey at the end." Nell Minow of Common Sense Media gave the film 1/5 stars, writing: "The characters are unpleasant, the jokes are unfunny, and the sentiment is hypocritical -- so this movie is about as unappetizing as last year's figgy pudding." Stephen Hunter of The Washington Post wrote: "Christmas With the Kranks is a leaden whimsy so heavy it threatens to crash through the multiplex floor." Claudia Puig of USA Today wrote: "You will not want to spend Christmas, or any other day of the year, with the Kranks. Or, for that matter, in the company of their uncommonly nosy, self-righteous and meddling friends and neighbors."

Scott Foundas of Variety was more positive, calling it "an agreeable, if snowflake-thin stocking stuffer faithfully adapted from John Grisham's 2001 bestseller Skipping Christmas."

Home media
Christmas with the Kranks was released on DVD and VHS on March 8, 2005, and on UMD Video for PSP on November 8, 2005. It was released on November 14, 2005, in the UK. Sony Pictures Home Entertainment later released the film on Blu-ray on November 16, 2021.

See also
 List of Christmas films

References

External links

 
 
 Jamie Lee Curtis interview

2004 films
2000s Christmas comedy films
2000s English-language films
American Christmas comedy films
Films based on American novels
Films based on works by John Grisham
Films set in Illinois
Films shot in Chicago
Films shot in Los Angeles
Films shot in Vancouver
1492 Pictures films
Revolution Studios films
Films with screenplays by Chris Columbus
Films directed by Joe Roth
Films produced by Chris Columbus
Films produced by Michael Barnathan
Films scored by John Debney
2004 comedy films
Columbia Pictures films
American children's comedy films
2000s American films
Santa Claus in film